Stanton Warburton (April 13, 1865 – December 24, 1926) was a U.S. Representative from Washington.

Life
Born in Sullivan County, Pennsylvania, Warburton moved to Iowa with his parents, who settled in Cherokee in 1868.

He attended the public schools. He was graduated from Cherokee (Iowa) High School in 1884 and from Coe College, Cedar Rapids, Iowa, in 1888. He moved to Tacoma, Washington, in 1888. He studied law and was  admitted to the bar in 1889, commencing practice in Tacoma. He served as member of the State senate 1896–1904.

Warburton was elected as a Republican to the Sixty-second Congress (March 4, 1911 – March 3, 1913).
He was an unsuccessful candidate for reelection in 1912 to the Sixty-third Congress, and afterwards resumed the practice of law in Tacoma, Washington.

He died in Boston, Massachusetts, December 24, 1926, and was interred in Mountain View Burial Park, Tacoma, Washington.

References

 

1865 births
1926 deaths
Republican Party members of the United States House of Representatives from Washington (state)